These are the results of the women's individual all-around competition, one of six events for female competitors in artistic gymnastics at the 1968 Summer Olympics in Mexico City.

Competition format

Each nation entered a team of six gymnasts or up to three individual gymnasts. All entrants in the gymnastics competitions performed both a compulsory exercise and a voluntary exercise for each apparatus. The scores for all 8 exercises were summed to give an individual all-around score.

These exercise scores were also used for qualification for the new apparatus finals. The two exercises (compulsory and voluntary) for each apparatus were summed to give an apparatus score; the top 6 in each apparatus participated in the finals; others were ranked 7th through 101st. In the final, each gymnast performed the compulsory and voluntary exercises again; scores from the preliminary did not carry over.

Results

References

External links
Official Olympic Report
www.gymnasticsresults.com
www.gymn-forum.net

Women's artistic individual all-around
Olympics
1968 in women's gymnastics
Women's events at the 1968 Summer Olympics